A choker setter or choke setter is a logger who attaches cables to logs for retrieval by skidders or skylines. The work process involves the choker setter wrapping a special cable end (choker) around a log and then moving clear so the yarding engineer (e.g. skidder operator) can pull the log to a central area. In clearcutting, fallers will typically cut down all the trees and limb and buck them into logs before the choke setters and others arrive to remove the logs.

Radio controlled

Old chokers were made of metal. New chokers are safer, quicker and thus more productive. They are also radio controlled.

See also
Donkey puncher

References

Further reading

External links
Information Technology Associates - Dictionary of Occupational Titles
Self-releasing log choker

Logging
Forestry occupations
Logging in the United States
Timber industry